Seven-ball is a  pool game with rules similar to nine-ball, though it differs in two key ways: the game uses only seven  as implied by its name, and play is restricted to particular pockets of the table. William D. Clayton is credited with the game's invention in the early 1980s.

Rules
Once that selection is made, balls 1–6 may be  in any pocket in rotation, starting with the one, as the object ball. Balls pocketed via combinations off of the object ball are legal. The 7-ball must be pocketed in the called side to be a legal win. Scratches on any object ball allow the opponent ball-in-hand, but the sunk ball remains potted. Scratching on the 7-ball is a loss. Pocketing the 7-ball in any other pocket than the called side is a loss.

A special 7-ball was designed for television matches by Charles Ursitti (billiards historian, referee and Willie Mosconi's one time manager) to more easily distinguish the 7-ball from the 3 on television.

No special equipment is required for play; a regular set of pool balls and a nine-ball diamond rack turned sidewise are adequate.

The original informal incarnation of seven ball led to a variant professional ruleset that enjoyed a brief heyday in the series Sudden Death Seven-ball, broadcast on the American cable TV network ESPN from 2000 to 2005.

References

Pool (cue sports)